Ken Webster (born July 29, 1957 in Port Arthur, Texas) is an American director and actor. He is the artistic director of Hyde Park Theatre in Austin, Texas. He has been nominated for 47 B. Iden Payne Awards and 24 Critics' Table Awards for acting, directing, and producing. He has received fourteen B. Iden Payne Awards, including a 2008 award for directing Dog Sees God and a 2007 award for directing The Pillowman, a 2004 award for directing The Drawer Boy and a 2003 award for directing Quake at HPT. He also won the 2012 Critics' Table Award for Outstanding Direction for "The Aliens", 2007 Critics' Table Award for Outstanding Lead Acting for "St. Nicholas" and "Thom Pain (based on nothing)", and a 2003 Austin Critics’ Table award for directing Something Someone Someplace Else and Marion Bridge for HPT, and was awarded the 1999 Critics’ Table John Bustin Award for "conspicuous achievement." He was voted Best Director in the Austin Chronicle Reader's Poll in 2010, 2012, and 2013. His directing credits for HPT include The Pillowman, "Thom Pain (based on nothing)", "My Child, My Child, My Alien Child", You're No One's Nothing Special, Lonely, The Evidence of Silence Broken, Chopper, The Glory of Living, Radio :30, Ham, Blue Surge, Perdita, Blur, and the world premiere of Art Stripped Naked. His acting credits include "Slowgirl", "A Behanding in Spokane", "The Good Thief", "The Drawer Boy", "Blackbird", The Pillowman, The Water Principle, Vigil,  and House for HPT. His recent film and television acting credits include "Temple Grandin",  Waking Life, A Scanner Darkly, and Friday Night Lights. Webster is the only director in Austin to have received awards for directing in each of the last four decades. He was inducted into the Austin Arts Hall of Fame in June 2006. Webster is married to Austin actress and author Katherine Catmull.

He also did voiceover work in Metroid Prime 3: Corruption.

Filmography

Film

Television

Video games

References

External links

Hyde Park Theatre

1957 births
Living people
American male film actors
American male television actors
American male video game actors
American male voice actors
American theatre directors
People from Port Arthur, Texas
20th-century American male actors
21st-century American male actors